ㅝ (wo) is one of the Korean hangul. The Unicode for ㅝ is U+315D.

Hangul jamo
Vowel letters